Weshare Wealth 2018 Chinese FA Super Cup (Chinese: 掌众财富2018中国足球协会超级杯) was the 16th Chinese FA Super Cup, an annual football match contested by the winners of the previous season's Chinese Super League and FA Cup competitions. It was held at Hongkou Football Stadium on 26 February 2018. The match was played between Guangzhou Evergrande Taobao, champions of the 2017 Chinese Super League, and Shanghai Greenland Shenhua, the winner of the 2017 Chinese FA Cup. Policy of foreign players and U-23 domestic players was executed for the first time in the tournament. At most three foreign players can play in the match while at least one domestic player who is under the age of 23 (born on or after 1 January 1995) must be in the starting eleven; The total number of foreign players must be no more than the total number of U-23 domestic players in the match.

Guangzhou Evergrande Taobao won the match 4–1 with goals from Huang Bowen, Alan Carvalho, Gao Lin and Ricardo Goulart, either side of a goal from Shenhua midfielder Fredy Guarín. This was Guangzhou Evergrande's fourth Chinese FA Super Cup title, breaking a tie with Shanghai Shenhua and Dalian Shide which had stood since Guangzhou Evergrande won their third title last year.

Match

Details

Statistics

See also
2017 Chinese Super League
2017 Chinese FA Cup

References 

FA Super Cup
Guangzhou F.C. matches
February 2018 sports events in China